Octopus is the third album by the  British band The Bees, released in 2007. Octopus was self-produced in the band's own basement studio, The Steam Rooms, on the Isle of Wight.

A high-rip version of Octopus was leaked in its entirety in December 2006, three months before its scheduled release. The leak also led to the album's initial release date of 19 March being moved to a week later.

The CD version of Octopus is also an enhanced disc, which enables owners of the album to join The Bees' mailing list and have access to exclusive free content, including a downloadable version of the "Who Cares What The Question Is?" music video.

Critical reception
NME wrote: "On Octopus The Bees find their groove and sound blissfully unaware whether anyone else is listening. You should, they’ve made their best album yet." Clash wrote that "as multi-instrumentalists, The Bees create a magnificent, almost Spector-ish palette."

Track listing
All songs written and performed by The Bees.
"Who Cares What the Question Is?"  – 3:35
"Love in the Harbour"  – 4:02
"Left Foot Stepdown"  – 4:05
"Got to Let Go"  – 5:23
"Listening Man"  – 4:47
"Stand"  – 4:13
"(This Is for The) Better Days"  – 4:37
"The Ocularist"  – 3:56
"Hot One!"  – 2:45
"End of the Street"  – 1:55

Musicians
 Kris Birkin - Lead Guitar (1,7,9), Electric Guitar (2,3,5,7), Acoustic Twelve String Guitar (2), Claps (7), Vocals (8)
 Paul Butler - Vocals (1-10), Guitar (1), Piano (1,3,6,8), Electric Guitar (2,6,10), Tambourine (2,4), Drums (3-7,9,10), Trumpet (3,4,6), Hammond Organ (4,6), Saxophone (4,6), Triangle (5), Shakers (6,7,9), Recorder (6), Claps (7), Acoustic Guitar (8,10), Bongos (8), Cello (8), Sitar (8), Bell (9), Sound FX (10)
 Michael Clevett - Drums (1,2,8), Cowbell (1), Bass (3,4,6,7,9,10), Bongos (5,6), Vocals (7,8), Claps (7), Vocals (8)
 Aaron Fletcher - Vocals (1,7-9), Bass (2,5), Electric Guitar (4,7,9), Percussion (7), Claps (7,10), Acoustic Guitar (10), Sound FX (10)
 Warren Hampshire - Hammond Organ (1-3,5,7-9), Piano (3), Tambourine (5), Vocals (7,8), Claps (7), Jew's Harp (8)
 Carly Lacey - Claps (10)
 Heather McCallum - Flute (6), Claps (10)
 Andy Parkin - Saxophone (3)
 Itchy Parkin - Saxophone (3)
 Tim Parkin - Bass (1), Vocals (1,7-9), Harmonica (2), Trumpet (3-6), Trombone (3,10), Rhodes (4,7), Claps (7), Acoustic Guitar (8), Piano (9)

References

External links
The Bees' official website

2007 albums
The Bees (band) albums
Astralwerks albums